The Mongolian toad (Strauchbufo raddei), also known commonly as the piebald toad or the Siberian sand toad, is a species of toad in the family Bufonidae. The species is endemic to northeastern Asia.  It was formerly placed in the genus Bufo, then for a few years in Pseudepidalea until finally moved to its own genus Strauchbufo.

Etymology
The specific name, raddei, is in honor of German naturalist Gustav Radde.

Geographic range
S. raddei ranges through much of northern China, Mongolia, and the Russian Far East, and is also found in North Korea. It is particularly common in the Amur River basin of China and Russia.

Description

Habitat
S. raddei ranges through a wide range of habitats and is often found in dry regions, preferring sandy soil. It was first described based on specimens from the Alashan desert.  The species does not occur above , nor below .  The northernmost population is found on Olkhon Island in Russia's Lake Baikal.

Reproduction
The mating season of S. raddei occurs between March and July, depending on the local climate. Eggs are typically laid in shallow puddles, leading to the death of many tadpoles as the puddles dry up.

Diet
When adult, the Mongolian toad favours ants as food, particularly in arid regions. It also eats spiders and beetles.

Taxonomy
The Mongolian toad was classified as Bufo raddei prior to the 2006 definition of the genus Pseudepidalea. In 2010, it was shown that Pseudepidalea is a junior synonym of Bufotes. The divergent Mongolian toad was moved to its own genus Strauchbufo in 2012.

References

External links

Bufonidae
Amphibians of China
Amphibians of Korea
Amphibians of Mongolia
Amphibians of Russia
Amphibians described in 1842